Wright's sportive lemur (Lepilemur wrightae), or the Kalambatritra sportive lemur, is a sportive lemur endemic to Madagascar. It is found in southeastern Madagascar, living in primary and secondary mid-altitude forests.

Originally named L. wrighti, the name was found to be incorrectly formed and was corrected to L. wrightae in 2009.

References

Sportive lemurs
Mammals described in 2006